Frederick Lee, Baron Lee of Newton, PC (3 August 1906 – 4 February 1984) was a British Labour Party politician and peer.

Born in Manchester to Joseph and Margaret Lee, he was educated at Langworthy Road School of Engineering. He was Chairman of the Works Committee at Metropolitan-Vickers, Trafford Park, Manchester, and of the National Committee of the Amalgamated Engineering Union from 1944 to 1945.
Formerly a Member of Salford City Council, at the 1945 general election he was elected as Member of Parliament for Manchester Hulme.

When that constituency was abolished for the 1950 general election, he was elected for the Newton constituency in Lancashire, and sat for that constituency until retiring from Parliament at the  February 1974 general election. In 1960, on the death of Aneurin Bevan, he stood as a left-wing candidate for Labour's Deputy Leadership against George Brown and James Callaghan. After Callaghan had been eliminated, Lee was defeated by Brown by 146 votes to 83.

He was Parliamentary Private Secretary to the Chancellor of the Exchequer from 1948, and held Ministerial office as Parliamentary Secretary to the Ministry of Labour and National Service from 1950 to 1951, Minister of Power from 1964 to   1966, the last Secretary of State for the Colonies in 1966, and Chancellor of the Duchy of Lancaster from 1967 to 1969. He was appointed a Privy Counsellor in 1964, and on his retirement in 1974 was created a life peer on 1 July 1974 as Baron Lee of Newton, of Newton in the County of Merseyside.

References

External links
 

1906 births
1984 deaths
Amalgamated Engineering Union-sponsored MPs
Labour Party (UK) MPs for English constituencies
Lee of Newton
Members of the Privy Council of the United Kingdom
Metropolitan-Vickers people
Ministers in the Attlee governments, 1945–1951
Ministers in the Wilson governments, 1964–1970
Place of birth missing
Secretaries of State for the Colonies
UK MPs 1945–1950
UK MPs 1950–1951
UK MPs 1951–1955
UK MPs 1955–1959
UK MPs 1959–1964
UK MPs 1964–1966
UK MPs 1966–1970
UK MPs 1970–1974
UK MPs who were granted peerages
Life peers created by Elizabeth II
Chancellors of the Duchy of Lancaster